Momilactone-A synthase (momilactone A synthase, OsMAS) is an enzyme with systematic name 3beta-hydroxy-9beta-pimara-7,15-diene-19,6beta-olide:NAD(P)+ oxidoreductase. This enzyme catalyses the following chemical reaction

  3beta-hydroxy-9beta-pimara-7,15-diene-19,6beta-olide + NAD(P)+  momilactone A + NAD(P)H + H+

The rice phytoalexin momilactone A is a diterpenoid secondary metabolite that is involved in the defense mechanism of the plant. Momilactone A is produced in response to attack by a pathogen through the perception of elicitor signal molecules such as chitin oligosaccharide, or after exposure to UV irradiation.

References

External links 
 

EC 1.1.1